La-bar-tu (Assyrian) – Disease demon
 Labbu (Akkadian) – Sea snake
 Lady midday (Slavic) – Sunstroke spirit
 Ladon (Greek) – Dragon guarding the golden apples of the Hesperides
 Laelaps (Greek) – Enchanted dog that always caught his prey
 Laestrygonians (Greek) – Anthropophagic giants
 Lakanica (Slavic) – Field spirit
 Lake monster (Worldwide) – Gigantic animals reported to inhabit various lakes around the world
 Lakhey (Nepalese) – Demon with fangs
 La Llorona (Latin America) – Death spirit associated with drowning
 Lamassu (Akkadian and Sumerian) – Protective spirit with the form of a winged bull or human-headed lion
 Lambton Worm (English) – Giant worm
 Lamia (Greek) – Child-devouring monster
 Lamiak (Basque) – Water spirit with duck-like feet
 La Mojana (Colombian) – Shapeshifting, female water spirit
 Lampades (Greek) – Underworld nymph
 Landvættir (Norse) – Nature spirits
 Langmeidong  (Meitei mythology) – Semi human, semi hornbill creature
 Lares (Roman) – House spirit
 La Sayona (Venezuela) – Female ghost that punishes unfaithful husbands
 La Tunda (Colombian) – Nature spirit that seduces and kills men
 Lava bear – Miniature bear thought to inhabit the lava beds of south central Oregon 
 Laukų dvasios (Lithuanian) – Field spirit
 Lauma (Baltic) – Sky spirit
 Lavellan (Scottish) – Gigantic water rat
 Leanan sidhe (Celtic) – Fairy lover
 Leanashe (Irish) – Possessing spirit or vampire
 Leimakids (Greek) – Meadow nymph
 Leokampoi (Etruscan) – Fish-tailed lion
 Leontophone (Medieval Bestiary) – Tiny animal poisonous to lions
 Leprechaun (Irish) – Cobbler spirit
 Leszi (Slavic) – Tree spirit
 Leuce (Greek) – White poplar tree nymph
 Leucrota (Medieval Bestiary) – Crocotta-lion hybrid 
 Leviathan (Jewish) – Sea monster seen in Job 41
 Leyak (Balinese) – Anthropophagous flying head with entrails
 Libyan Aegipanes (Medieval Bestiaries) – Human-horse hybrid
 Libyan Satyr (Medieval Bestiaries) – Human-goat hybrid
 Lidérc (Hungary) – Magical chicken that transforms into a humanoid
 Lietuvēns (Latvia) - Soul of a murdered person
 Lightning Bird (Southern Africa) – Magical bird found at sites of lightning strikes
 Likho (Slavic) – One-eyed hag or goblin
 Lilin (Jewish) – Night-demoness
 Lilitu (Assyrian) – Winged demon
 Limnades (Greek) – Lake nymph
 Lindworm (Germanic) – Dragon
 Ljósálfar (Norse) – Sunlight spirits; the Light Elves
 Ljubi (Albanian) – Demoness 
 Llamhigyn Y Dwr (Welsh) – Frog-bat-lizard hybrid
 Loch Ness Monster (Scottish) – Serpentine sea monster
 Loki (Norse mythology) – God of night
 Lo-lol (Abenaki) – Hideous monster
 Lóng – Chinese dragon
 Longana (Italian) – Female human-goat hybrid and water spirit
 Long Ma (Chinese) – Dragon-horse hybrid
 Loogaroo (French America) – Shapeshifting, female vampire
 Lou Carcolh (French) – Snake-mollusk hybrid
 Loup-garou (French) – Werewolf
 Loveland frog (American Folklore) (Ohio) – Cryptid, Humanoid Frog  
 Lubber fiend (English) – House spirit
 Luduan (Chinese) – Truth-detecting animal
 Lugat (Albanian) – Vampire 
 Luison (Guaraní) – Werewolf | Cadaver-eating dog
 Lusca – Sea Monster
 Lutin (French) – Amusing goblin
 Lyngbakr
 Lynx (Medieval Bestiaries) – Feline guide spirit

L